Rehuankh was an Ancient Egyptian high official associated with kings Neferhotep I and Sobekhotep IV of the Thirteenth Dynasty during the Middle Kingdom. Rehuankh is known from a high number of sources, making him one of the best attested officials of the late Middle Kingdom.

Career

King's Acquaintance
His title was "King's Acquaintance" and worked together with King's Acquaintance Nebankh under the leadership of treasurer Senebi.

High Steward
Later he might have become high steward. However, this attestation is weak.

Attestations 
At Wadi el-Hudi, Rehuankh is known from inscriptions. He appears on a stela as part of the staff of treasurer Senebi. As high steward he is known from a statue.

Stela Berlin ÄM 7311

Stela Cairo CG 20104, 20147, 20614,

Stela Wadi el-Hudi 24. In Wadi el-Hudi, a granite round-topped stela dated to Year 6 of Sobekhotep IV.

Stela Wien ÄS 140 (along with Senebi)

References 

Officials of the Thirteenth Dynasty of Egypt